Gardere is an unincorporated area and census-designated place (CDP) in East Baton Rouge Parish, Louisiana, United States. The area is also known as Riverland. The population was 10,580 at the 2010 census, up from 8,992 in 2000. It is part of the Baton Rouge Metropolitan Statistical Area.

Geography
Gardere is located in southern East Baton Rouge Parish at  (30.351836, -91.128945). It is bordered to the west and the northeast by the city of Baton Rouge. Louisiana Highway 30 forms the southwestern edge of the CDP, and Louisiana Highway 42 runs through the northeast side of the CDP. Both highways lead northwest  to the center of Baton Rouge. Highway 30 leads south  to St. Gabriel, while Highway 42 leads east  to Interstate 10.

Demographics

As of the 2020 United States census, there were 13,203 people, 4,332 households, and 2,205 families residing in the CDP.

As of the census of 2000, there were 8,992 people, 3,216 households, and 2,010 families residing in the CDP. The racial makeup of the CDP was 22.83% White, 70.96% African American, 0.14% Native American, 2.15% Asian, 0.07% Pacific Islander, 2.21% from other races, and 1.63% from two or more races. Hispanic or Latino of any race were 5.71% of the population.

There were 3,216 households, out of which 43.5% had children under the age of 18 living with them, 29.7% were married couples living together, 26.9% had a female householder with no husband present, and 37.5% were non-families. 21.6% of all households were made up of individuals, and 0.8% had someone living alone who was 65 years of age or older. The average household size was 2.79 and the average family size was 3.34.

In the CDP, the population was spread out, with 33.7% under the age of 18, 20.0% from 18 to 24, 34.8% from 25 to 44, 10.3% from 45 to 64, and 1.3% who were 65 years of age or older. The median age was 24 years. For every 100 females, there were 97.1 males. For every 100 females age 18 and over, there were 89.9 males.

The median income for a household in the CDP was $26,223, and the median income for a family was $27,550. Males had a median income of $27,219 versus $20,735 for females. The per capita income for the CDP was $11,448. About 22.7% of families and 27.8% of the population were below the poverty line, including 34.3% of those under age 18 and 15.1% of those age 65 or over.

Education
East Baton Rouge Parish Public Schools serves Gardere.

Three elementary schools serve sections of Gardere: Highland, Magnolia Woods, and Wildwood. All residents of Gardere are zoned to Kenilworth Middle School.  Kenilworth is under the administration of the Recovery School District (RSD). Half of the residents of Gardere may also attend Glasgow Middle School while, in the other half, the option middle school is Westdale Middle School; both schools are directly controlled by EBR Parish Schools. Residents in the western section are zoned to McKinley High School, while those in the eastern section are zoned to Tara High School.

When Robert E. Lee High School was in operation, it served all of Gardere.

References

Census-designated places in East Baton Rouge Parish, Louisiana
Census-designated places in Louisiana
Baton Rouge metropolitan area